Ashley Hart may refer to:

 Ashley Hart (cricketer) (born 1956), New Zealand cricketer
 Ashley Hart (model) (born 1988), Australian model and yogi